Claus Peter Zoller is a linguist and professor of South Asian Studies at the Department of Culture Studies and Oriental Languages of the University of Oslo. His research interests include Hindi literature and linguistics, the languages of the Western Himalayas (Western Pahari) and northern Pakistan (Dardic), cultural traditions and ethnography of those regions, as well as Romani linguistics. He is known for his work on the documentation of Indus Kohistani and Bangani, and his broader work on the linguistic history of Indo-Aryan languages.

Works

References

Academic staff of the University of Oslo
Linguists of Indo-Aryan languages
Linguists of Hindi
Linguists of Romani
Indologists
Year of birth missing (living people)
Living people